The Downtown Plainfield Historic District is the historic downtown area of Plainfield, Illinois, United States. The four block district reflects popular architectural styles of the mid-19th through mid-20th century.

History
Plainfield, Illinois was founded in August 1834 by Chester Ingersoll, who platted a town just north of the 1828 settlement of Walkers Corners. That December, Levi Arnold bought the land directly north of Ingersoll's and began to subdivide it; this area would later become the historic district. Lockport Road connected the two settlements and became an important thoroughfare once the canal opened in 1848. Plainfield was also a convenient stop for travelers going between Chicago and Ottawa. Most early development was residential, but by the late 1840s, a concentration of commercial developments began to organize at the junction between Ingersoll and Arnold's plats. Isaiah Clippinger subdivided his property for commercial use on the south side of Lockport Street between Des Plaines and Illinois Streets. The DuPage Inn and Tavern was one of the first major commercial ventures, located about where 24216 Lockport Street is now.

The Village of Plainfield was formed in 1869 when the northern and southern sections decided to unite; it was incorporated in 1877 with a population around 700. Most commercial structures were wood-framed and were destroyed during a series of four fires from 1888 to 1899. Development in the ensuing decades was prompted by Plainfield's location on an important transportation corridor. In 1904, the Aurora, Plainfield & Joliet Railway provided interurban service between these three cities and located their maintenance shop at 24216 Lockport Street. Lincoln Highway, which passed through town via Lockport Street, was designated in the late 1920s as the first transcontinental highway for automobiles, promoting auto-related commercial development in Plainfield. The Standard Oil station at the southwest corner of Des Plaines and Lockport is the best surviving remnant of the era.

References

Historic districts on the National Register of Historic Places in Illinois
National Register of Historic Places in Will County, Illinois
Historic districts on the National Register of Historic Places in Idaho